Alexander Bay is a town in the extreme north-west of South Africa. It is located on the southern bank of the Orange River mouth.  It was named for Sir James Alexander, who was the first person to map the area whilst on a Royal Geographical Society expedition into Namibia in 1836.  (It is mistakenly believed by many locals that it was he who first established commercial copper mining in the area.)  With diamonds being discovered along the West Coast in 1925, Alexander Bay was established to service the mining industry.

The town of Oranjemund lies on the northern bank of the river, which forms the international border with Namibia.  The two towns are linked by the Ernest Oppenheimer Bridge, named for Ernest Oppenheimer in 1951.

The town is served by Alexander Bay Airport.

History

Diamonds
After diamonds were discovered along this coast in 1925 by Dr Hans Merensky, Alexander Bay became known for its mining activities.  The resulting diamond rush led to the Diamond Coast rebellion of 1928.

Copper
Copper ore was shipped through the Richtersveld in barges down the Orange River for export from this bay. The town was a high security area and permits were needed when entered. It is no longer a high security area and no permits are needed.

Geography and climate
Alexander Bay is the most northerly situated town along the west coastline of South Africa. The Orange River enters the Atlantic Ocean at Alexander Bay. The Orange River wetland forms the border between South Africa and Namibia. The Orange River wetland is a declared Ramsar site. Fields of green and orange lichen grow on a hill near the turnoff to Alexander Bay town.

The cold Benguela Current in the Atlantic Ocean has a moderating influence on the coastal climate with only small variations in diurnal and seasonal temperatures.

References

Namibia–South Africa border crossings
Orange River
Populated places established in 1925
Populated places in the Richtersveld Local Municipality